Robert Earl Hughes (December 15, 1930 – October 11, 2012) was an American water polo player and breaststroke swimmer who competed in the 1952 and 1956 Summer Olympics.

He was born in Lennox, California.  He attended the University of Southern California (USC), where he swam for the USC Trojans swimming and diving team in National Collegiate Athletic Association (NCAA) competition.

Hughes was a member of the U.S. water polo team which finished fourth in the 1952 tournament.  He played in all nine matches for the U.S. team.

Four years later he finished fifth with the American team the water polo tournament at the 1956 Summer Olympics in Melbourne, Australia.  He played five matches.  He also participated in the 200-meter breaststroke, but did not advance beyond the preliminary heats.

In 1976, he was inducted into the USA Water Polo Hall of Fame.

See also
 List of multi-sport athletes
 List of University of Southern California people
 Water polo at the 1952 Summer Olympics – Men's team squads
 Water polo at the 1956 Summer Olympics – Men's team squads

References

External links
 
 Robert Hughes' obituary

1930 births
2012 deaths
Olympic water polo players of the United States
Olympic swimmers of the United States
Swimmers at the 1956 Summer Olympics
USC Trojans men's swimmers
Water polo players at the 1952 Summer Olympics
Water polo players at the 1956 Summer Olympics
American male water polo players
American water polo coaches